Walter Wilbert Swanson Bunch (15 August 1872 – 1937) was an English professional footballer who made 70 appearances in the Football League playing for Wolverhampton Wanderers, Walsall and Small Heath.

Bunch was born in Weston-super-Mare, Somerset. A full back, he entered league football when he joined First Division side Wolverhampton Wanderers in August 1895. He made his Football League debut on 4 January 1896 in a 4–0 defeat at Bolton Wanderers. Only ever a reserve, he made just seven first-team appearances during four seasons with the club.

He moved to Walsall in the 1899 close season, and played regularly, making 61 appearances in two seasons. At the end of his second season, Walsall failed to gain re-election to the Football League, so he signed for a third Midlands club, Small Heath, in September 1901. He played three times in the 1901–02 season, deputising for established full-backs Archie Goldie and Arthur Archer, but was forced to retire in 1902, his career cut short by illness and injury.

He went on to run a pub in Dudley, and died in Somerset in 1937.

References

1872 births
1937 deaths
English footballers
Association football fullbacks
Wolverhampton Wanderers F.C. players
Bristol Rovers F.C. players
Walsall F.C. players
Birmingham City F.C. players
English Football League players
People from Weston-super-Mare
Date of death missing